This Bruce Barrymore Halpenny bibliography is a list of books by the author and military historian Bruce Barrymore Halpenny.  The author wrote for many magazines in the 1950s, 1960s and 1970s – some under his own name and some under pseudonyms.  At one time he was writing articles for up to 14 military journals around the world when he was approached by the publishers Patrick Stephens to do the airfield books due to his vast knowledge and authority.  Books are in order by date.

List of books

 Action Stations: Wartime Military Airfields of Lincolnshire and the East Midlands v. 2 (Hardcover)  (1981)
 Action Stations: Military Airfields of Yorkshire v. 4 (Hardcover)  (1982)
 English Electric/BAC Lightning (Hardcover)  (1984)
 To Shatter the Sky: Bomber Airfield at War (Hardcover) (1984)
 Action Stations: Military Airfields of Greater London v. 8 (Hardcover)  (1984)
 Ghost Stations (Paperback)  (1986)
 Fight for the Sky: Stories of Wartime Fighter Pilots (Hardcover)  (1986)
 Aaargh!: Ghosts, Mystery, Superstition (Paperback)  (1989)
 Wartime Poems (Paperback)  (1990)
 Action Stations: Military Airfields of Yorkshire v. 4 (Hardcover) (Updated version with new material)  (1990)
 Ghost Stations: True Ghost Mystery Stories: No. 3 (Paperback)  (1990)
 Action Stations: Wartime Military Airfields of Lincolnshire and the East Midlands v. 2 (Hardcover) (Updated version with new material)  (1991)
 Ghost Stations: True Ghost Mystery Stories: No. 4 (Paperback)  (1991)
 Little Nellie 007 (Paperback)  (1991)
 Ghost Stations: True Ghost Mystery Stories: No. 5 (Paperback)  (1993)
 Action Stations: Military Airfields of Greater London v. 8 (Hardcover) (Updated version with new material)  (1993)
 Ghost Stations: True Ghost Mystery Stories: No. 6 (Paperback)  (1994)
 Brother Wolf, Wolf Preservation Foundation. . (1994)
 Ghost Stations 7 (Paperback)  (1995)
 Layman's Guide to Protecting Yourself and Your Property Against Crime (Paperback)  (1995)
 Ghost Stations 8 (Paperback)  (1998)
 An English Town: Market Rasen (Paperback) (2004)
 Bomber Aircrew of World War II: True Stories of Frontline Air Combat (Paperback)  (2004)
 Bullets in the Morning...Bullets at Night: The Italian Campaign (Paperback)  (2004)
 Fighter Pilots in World War II: True Stories of Frontline Air Combat (Paperback)  (2004)
 English Electric Canberra: The History and Development of a Classic Jet (Hardcover)  (2005)
 Avro Vulcan: The History and Development of a Classic Jet (Hardcover)  (2006)
 The Avro Vulcan Adventure (Paperback)  (2007)
 Ghost Stations 1 (Paperback) (2008)
 Ghost Stations 2 (Paperback) (2008)
 Ghost Stations 3 (Paperback) (2008)
 Ghost Stations 4 (Paperback) (2008)
 Ghost Stations 5 (Paperback)  (2008)
 Ghost Stations Mysteries (Paperback) (2008)
 Ghost Stations Lincolnshire (Paperback) (2008)
Ways of the Wolf, Wolf Preservation Foundation. . (2011)

References

Halpenny, Bruce Barrymore
 
Halpenny, Bruce Barrymore